(born June 11, 1976) is a Japanese mixed martial artist and professional wrestler. Known for his pro wrestling career in UWF International, Yamamoto also competed against some of the best MMA fighters of his era in RINGS, Pride and the UFC, taking on Kevin Randleman, Genki Sudo and Pat Miletich, among others. In 1999, Yamamoto won the UFC 23 Middleweight Tournament in Japan. He returned to the ring against former Light Heavyweight King Of Pancrase Keiichiro Yamamiya on October 27, 2012. He lost via unanimous decision.

Professional wrestling career
A fan of Akira Maeda, Yamamoto was trained in karate since his childhood and entered the Seidokaikan school before turning his attention to professional wrestling. In 1993, he was accepted in Union of Wrestling Forces International and debuted on October 14 in a match against Kazushi Sakuraba. After two years on the mid card, he joined Yoji Anjo and Yoshihiro Takayama to form the Golden Cups stable, in which he gained fame. In 1996, UWF International closed and Yamamoto moved to Kingdom, before eventually joining Fighting Network Rings in 1998. While in RINGS, he had to skip several months of action due to a surgery to remove a benign tumor, and ended up leaving the company in 1999.

Mixed martial arts career

Ultimate Fighting Championship
In November 1999 Yamamoto had his Ultimate Fighting Championship debut at the UFC 23 event, taking part on the night's tournament. His first opponent was Wajutsu Keishukai representative Daiju Takase. The fight was slow, with Yamamoto being the superior striker and Takase constantly pulling guard to stop the action, so Kenichi resorted to headbutts to the midsection to do damage and even performed a cartwheel guard pass inspired on his training partner Sakuraba. Takase tried some high kicks and a triangle choke, but Yamamoto blocked them and landed punches and elbow strikes to the body, winning the decision.

The final fight was against Katsuhisa Fujii, which proved to be a tougher bout. The heavier Fujii took Yamamoto down several times and attacked with ground and pound, consistently endangering the former RINGS wrestler. However, after opting to pull guard at the start of the second round, Kenichi surprised Fujii with a kneebar and made him tap out, winning the fight and the tournament.

Championships and accomplishments

Mixed martial arts 
Ultimate Fighting Championship
UFC 23 Middleweight Tournament Champion

Professional wrestling 
Wrestle Association "R"
WAR World Six-Man Tag Team Championship (1 time) – with Yoji Anjo & Yoshihiro Takayama

Mixed martial arts record

|-
| Loss
| align=center| 5–12–2
| Kazuo Takahashi
| KO (knee)
| U-Spirits - U-Spirits Again
| 
| align=center| 1
| align=center| 6:29
| Tokyo, Japan
|
|-
| Loss
| align=center| 5–11–2
| Keiichiro Yamamiya
| Decision (unanimous)
| Grabaka Live 2
| 
| align=center| 2
| align=center| 5:00
| Tokyo, Japan
| 
|-
| Loss
| align=center| 5–10–2
| Sanae Kikuta
| TKO (punches)
| Grabaka Live: 1st Cage Attack
| 
| align=center| 1
| align=center| 2:18
| Tokyo, Japan
| 
|-
| Loss
| align=center| 5–9–2
| Diego Lionel Vitosky
| TKO (corner stoppage)
| MARS: Bodog Fight
| 
| align=center| 2
| align=center| n/a
| Tokyo, Japan
| 
|-
| Loss
| align=center| 5–8–2
| Kaream Ellington
| TKO (punches)
| Mix FC: USA vs. Russia 3
| 
| align=center| 1
| align=center| 4:51
| Atlantic City, New Jersey
| 
|-
| Win
| align=center| 5–7–2
| German Reyes
| KO (high kick)
| Ryukyu Fight Night 2
| 
| align=center| 2
| align=center| 2:20
| Okinawa, Japan
| 
|-
| Loss
| align=center| 4–7–2
| Ikuhisa Minowa
| TKO (punches)
| Pride Bushido 4
| 
| align=center| 1
| align=center| 3:23
| Nagoya, Japan
| 
|-
| Loss
| align=center| 4–6–2
| Alexander Otsuka
| Decision (unanimous)
| Pride 25
| 
| align=center| 3
| align=center| 5:00
| Yokohama, Japan
| 
|-
| Loss
| align=center| 4–5–2
| Kevin Randleman
| TKO (knees)
| Pride 23
| 
| align=center| 3
| align=center| 1:16
| Tokyo, Japan
| 
|-
| Loss
| align=center| 4–4–2
| Genki Sudo
| Submission (rear-naked choke)
| Rings: World Title Series 5
| 
| align=center| 2
| align=center| 1:46
| Yokohama, Japan
| 
|-
| Draw
| align=center| 4–3–2
| Akira Yasumura
| Draw
| Club Fight Nagoya
| 
| align=center| 1
| align=center| 10:00
| Nagoya, Japan
| 
|-
| Draw
| align=center| 4–3–1
| Kenji Akiyama
| Draw
| Club Fight Osaka
| 
| align=center| 1
| align=center| 10:00
| Osaka, Japan
| 
|-
| Loss
| align=center| 4–3
| Pat Miletich
| Submission (guillotine choke)
| UFC 29
| 
| align=center| 2
| align=center| 1:58
| Tokyo, Japan
| 
|-
| Win
| align=center| 4–2
| Tatsuya Kurahashi
| KO (punches)
| Club Fight: Round 1
| 
| align=center| 1
| align=center| 8:00
| Tokyo, Japan
| 
|-
| Win
| align=center| 3–2
| Katsuhisa Fujii
| Submission (kneebar)
| UFC 23
| 
| align=center| 1
| align=center| 4:15
| Urayasu, Japan
| 
|-
| Win
| align=center| 2–2
| Daiju Takase
| Decision (unanimous)
| UFC 23
| 
| align=center| 3
| align=center| 5:00
| Urayasu, Japan
| 
|-
| Loss
| align=center| 1–2
| Kiyoshi Tamura
| TKO
| Rings: World Mega Battle Tournament
| 
| align=center| 2
| align=center| 1:26
| Tokyo, Japan
| 
|-
| Loss
| align=center| 1–1
| Masayuki Naruse
| Submission
| Rings: Fourth Fighting Integration
| 
| align=center| 1
| align=center| 11:07
| Tokyo, Japan
| 
|-
| Win
| align=center| 1–0
| Chris Haseman
| Submission
| Rings: Third Fighting Integration
| 
| align=center| 1
| align=center| 12:39
| Tokyo, Japan
|

Kickboxing record

|-
|
|Win
| Den Sakumonti
|M-1 Muay Thai Challenge
|Tokyo, Japan
|KO (elbow)
|align="center"|3
|align="center"|1:24
|1-0
|Muay thai rules
|-
| colspan=10 | Legend:

References

External links 
 
 
 RINGS fight history

1976 births
Living people
People from Kadoma, Osaka
Japanese male mixed martial artists
Japanese male professional wrestlers
Light heavyweight mixed martial artists
Mixed martial artists utilizing Seidokaikan
Mixed martial artists utilizing wrestling
Ultimate Fighting Championship male fighters
Japanese male karateka
20th-century professional wrestlers
21st-century professional wrestlers
Tenryu Project World 6-Man Tag Team Champions